Yaakov Meir CBE (1856–1939), was an Orthodox rabbi, and the first Sephardic Chief Rabbi appointed under the British Mandate of Palestine. A Talmudic scholar, fluent in Hebrew as well as five other languages, he enjoyed a reputation as one of Jerusalem's most respected rabbis.

Early life
Meir was born in Jerusalem in 1856, the son of successful merchant Calev Mercado. He studied the Talmud under Rabbi Menachem Bechor Yitzhak, and at age 15 began to study Kabbalah under Rabbi Aharon Azriel, an elder of the Beit El Synagogue. He married his wife Rachel at age 17, and continued to study Torah in the years after his marriage. He was among the founders of a Bikur cholim society in 1879.

In 1882, he was sent to Bukhara as the first emissary to visit there. He was received with great respect by the Jews of Bukhara, and children were named for him during his stay. He was instrumental in encouraging the immigration of Bukhara Jews to the Land of Israel. In 1885, 1888, and 1900, he visited Tunisia and Algeria as an emissary. In 1888, he was appointed a member of the Beth Din of Rabbi Yaakov Shaul Elyashar in Jerusalem, serving in this position until 1899. Under Turkish rule, he often interceded with the authorities on behalf of the Jewish community; he also encouraged the construction of new Jewish quarters of Jerusalem, helping establish the new neighborhoods of Ezrat Yisrael, Yemin Moshe, and the Bukharim Quarter. He worked to bring the Sephardic and Ashkenazi communities together, and established an association called Hitachadut composed of Sephardim and Ashkenazim. He helped establish the Sha'ar Zion Hospital in Jaffa in 1891. 

Meir was committed to the Revival of the Hebrew language, and together with Eliezer Ben-Yehuda, Chaim Hirschensohn, and Chaim Kalmi, he co-founded the Safa Brura ("clear language") association, which was created in 1889 to teach and encourage the use of Hebrew. He was a founding member of the Hebrew Language Committee, which was established by Ben-Yehuda in 1890 and was later succeeded by the Academy of the Hebrew Language.

In 1899, Meir was appointed deputy head of the Beth Din of Rabbi Raphael Yitzhak Yisrael. Following Elyashar's death in 1906, he was picked to succeed him as the chief rabbi of Jerusalem, but his appointment was vetoed by his opponents, supported by the Hakham Bashi in Constantinople, because of his Zionist affiliations. He was subsequently inducted as Hakham Bashi of the Land of Israel, but six months later, he was deposed by the Sultan of Turkey, and Eliyahu Moshe Panigel took charge of overseeing the Orthodox community.

Salonika

Meir went on to be elected chief rabbi of Salonika in 1908, where he remained until 1919. He was elected chief rabbi of Jerusalem in 1911, but the Jews of Salonika prevented him from assuming the office.

Palestine
In 1921, the Chief Rabbinate of Palestine was established. Meir was elected as Sephardi chief rabbi of Palestine, and took the position, assuming the title of "Rishon le-Zion". He was at the forefront of the effort to revive Hebrew as a modern language. He held the post until his death. A letter he wrote in 1936 called an "Appeal for Friendliness" called on the Muslims of Jerusalem to halt any hatred and animosity towards Jews who were returning to their Holy Land.

Meir died on May 26, 1939, aged 83 years old. Over 10,000 Jewish residents of Jerusalem, representing all sections of the population, took part in the funeral procession.

Honours
In 1920, Meir was honoured with the Commander of the Order of the British Empire award for service to the British. He was also awarded the French Legion of Honor, and received decorations from the sultan of Turkey and the Greek government, as well as Hussein bin Ali, King of Hejaz. In 2006, the Israel Postal Company issued a stamp bearing his image.

Sources

 Jewish Virtual Library: Rabbi Jacob Meir
 Virtual Judaica: Protest petition on behalf of R. Jacob Meir 
 Remembering Chief Rabbi Jacob Meir - On the Occasion of the 90th Anniversary of the Balfour Declaration

1856 births
1939 deaths
Rabbis in Jerusalem
Rishon LeZion (rabbi)
20th-century rabbis from the Ottoman Empire
Commanders of the Order of the British Empire
Recipients of the Legion of Honour
Burials at the Jewish cemetery on the Mount of Olives
Jews and Judaism in Thessaloniki
Hebrew language
Zionists
Orthodox rabbis in Ottoman Palestine
Sephardi rabbis in Ottoman Palestine